Oxyna guttatofasciata is a species of fruit fly in the family Tephritidae.

Distribution
Oxyna guttatofasciata is located in: Kazakhstan, West & South East Siberia, Mongolia, and China.

References

Tephritinae
Insects described in 1850
Diptera of Asia